ABQ Uptown is an outdoor luxury shopping mall owned by Simon Property Group in Albuquerque, New Mexico. It is one of four malls located in the Albuquerque area, and houses 51 different stores. Its anchor tenants include J.Crew, The North Face, and Lush, as well as the only Apple Store in New Mexico. The outdoor environment of this mall includes music, lights and seasonal decorations.

Background

ABQ Uptown opened in 2006 as an open air lifestyle center. It was developed by Hunt Development Group, a diversified, family-owned holding company that invests in operating businesses, real estate assets, and infrastructure assets with a Southwest Division based in El Paso, and was designed by Dekker/Perich/Sabatini, a local architecture firm that specializes in southwest and green design.

History
The brownfield site was a vacant 20 acre lot between Coronado and Winrock Malls, originally the site of St. Pius X High School. The school was razed in the late 1980s to make room for an ambitious mixed-use development called The Commons, which would have included two 22-story office towers and a 14-story hotel. However, this project fell apart and the land remained vacant. The lot was purchased and designed as a mixed-use development zone by Hunt Building Corporation, including a lifestyle center, housing, offices, and a grocery store. In November 2006, ABQ Uptown was opened, and brought more retail chains to the area, including several stores that previously did not serve Albuquerque or New Mexico, such as the state's only Apple Store. Below the infill site, a three level, 300 space parking garage was built to facilitate extra parking.

Today
ABQ Uptown opened in two phases. Phase one opened in November 2006, and included the shopping centers, parking garage, and the realignment of roads and utilities in the area. Phase two was the development and construction of multi-family housing, and opened in 2008. Simon Property Group, who used to own Cottonwood Mall (the fourth mall in the metropolitan area, and the only one not in the uptown area), purchased ABQ Uptown from Hunt Building Corporation in 2012. Many of the shops and eateries at ABQ Uptown are very popular. The businesses that it currently hosts are Alfred Angelo, Ann Taylor, Anthropologie, Apple, AT&T, Banana Republic, BCBGMAXAZRIA, Bravo Cucina Italiana, California Pizza Kitchen, Charming Charlie, Chico's, Eddie Bauer, Elephant Bar Restaurant, Fidelity Investments, First National Rio Grande, Francesca's, GAP, Gymboree, Jared The Galleria of Jewelry, J. Crew, J.Jill, Jos. A. Bank Clothiers, L'Occitane en Provence, Lucky Brand, Lululemon Athletica, Lush, MAC Cosmetics, McAlister's Deli, Michael Kors, Pottery Barn, Sleep Number, Soma, Starbucks, Sunglass Hut, Sushi Freak, Talbots, Teavana, Mati, The Melting Pot, The North Face, T-Mobile, Toni & Guy Hairdressing Academy, White House Black Market, and Williams Sonoma. This 1,000,000 square foot shopping center is a new main attraction in Albuquerque, New Mexico.

Competing Real estate owners Simon Property Group, Brookfield Properties, and Goodman Realty Group own ABQ Uptown, Coronado Center, and Winrock Center respectively, and are making efforts to revitalize the uptown area. New growth includes the removal of the old Winrock Inn and Winrock 6 theater, and the construction of a new Theater, complete with the city's first IMAX theater. New stores and restaurants such as Dave & Busters, BJ's Restaurant, California Pizza Kitchen, Pottery Barn, and H&M are some of the first-to-market offerings that have come to Albuquerque in recent years. Other stores, such as Banana Republic, The Gap and local jeweler Mati have moved from other malls to ABQ Uptown in an effort to boost business and visibility.

Apartments
Along with creating a new shopping center with popular and brand name shops, part of the areas efforts to uplift this uptown area, apartments were added across the street from the ABQ Uptown shopping center. The 198 unit building opened in 2008. These efficient apartments come with several amenities. These amenities include; Energy efficient lighting, energy efficient windows, expansive 9' to 12' ceilings, full sized washer and dryer, granite countertops, modern track lighting, personal balconies and patios, stainless steel appliances, spacious walk-in closets, stained concrete and wood style floor, and wired for technology. The apartments and the area also come with community amenities that include; a fitness center, pool and wellness center, cafe and lounge, recycling program, and wifi. The pricing and availability of these apartments are subject to change depending on the sized added amenities. There are many different sizes of apartments at the ABQ Uptown Village including number of bedrooms and type of apartments such as studios. These apartments allow pets depending on their size. These apartments are a convenient distance to the ABQ uptown shopping center.

Events
 Taste of ABQ- A food festival which follows the trend across the U.S. featuring local cuisine. Restaurants based at ABQ Uptown as well as other local restaurants participate in the event, which lasts for one day in early August. 
 Christmas Tree Lighting- Each year, the mall holds an annual Christmas tree lighting with live music and entertainment as well as many sales throughout stores in the mall. The lighting usually takes place in early December each year. This Christmas tree lighting includes a 45-foot Christmas tree in the middle of all the shops that make a huge attraction for the holidays. This event also includes various performances for entertainment. 
 Holiday Stroll- The mall also holds a yearly holiday stroll the same night as the Christmas tree lighting. The stroll usually includes free hot chocolate, fondue, and baked goods provided by nearly every store in the mall. Toni and Guys famous "mini manicures" are also given out at various locations around the mall.

References

Shopping malls in New Mexico
Simon Property Group
Shopping malls established in 1965
Buildings and structures in Albuquerque, New Mexico
Tourist attractions in Albuquerque, New Mexico